Jesper Bruun Monberg (born Jesper Bruun Jensen 14 October 1977 in Esbjerg, Denmark) is a former speedway rider from Denmark.

Career
Jensen came to prominence in 1997 when he won the 1997 Speedway Under-21 World Championship. This was the same year that he joined Wolverhampton Wolves. He was also a team member of the Danish side that won the 1997 Team World Championship.

He rode for Wolves for seven seasons, until he joined Ipswich Witches in 2004. In 2005, he joined Peterborough Panthers and Oxford Cheetahs and won the 2005 Individual European Championship. During the 2006 Elite League speedway season Jensen was instrumental in helping Peterborough win the Elite League title. He averaged 8.76 as the team topped the regular season table and then won the play offs.
 

Previously known as Jesper B. Jensen, in March 2008 he changed his last name to that of his wife Rikke Monberg.

He continued to ride for various clubs in Britain and Poland until he retired after the 2015 season.

Career summary 
 Individual World Championship (Speedway Grand Prix)
 1997 – 21st place (4 points)
 1998 – 22nd place (14 points)
 1999 – 28th place (3 points)
 2000 – 29th place (4 points)
 2001 – 34th place (3 points)
 2003 – 43rd place (1 point)
 2004 – 18th place (37 points)
 2007 – 35th place (0 points)
 Individual U-21 World Championship
 1996 – 3rd place (11 points +2)
 1997 – World Champion (14 points)
 Team World Championship (Speedway World Cup)
 1996 – 3rd place (4 points)
 1997 – World Champion (reserve)
 1999 – 2nd place (14 points) in Semi-Final A
2000 – 2nd place (6 points) in Semi-Final B
 2001 – 4th place (5 points)
 2004 – 2ns place (reserve)
 Individual European Championship
 2005 – 4th  place (11 points +2)
 2005 – European Champion (14 points +3)
 Individual Danish Championship
 2001 – 3rd place
 2003 – 3rd place
 Individual Junior Danish Championship
 1994 – 2nd place

References

See also 
 List of Speedway Grand Prix riders
 Denmark national speedway team

1977 births
Living people
Danish speedway riders
Ipswich Witches riders
Oxford Cheetahs riders
Peterborough Panthers riders
Somerset Rebels riders
Swindon Robins riders
Wolverhampton Wolves riders
Individual Speedway European Champions
People from Esbjerg
Sportspeople from the Region of Southern Denmark